Idiopathic eruptive macular pigmentation is a skin condition developing in young persons, with an average age of 11, characterized by asymptomatic widespread brown to gray macules of up to several centimeters in diameter on the neck, trunk, and proximal extremities.

See also 
 Lichen planus
 Skin lesion

References 

Lichenoid eruptions